Tridrepana postica is a moth in the family Drepanidae. It was described by Frederic Moore in 1879. It is found in north-eastern India and Malaysia.

The wingspan is about 27.4-37.4 mm for males and 35.8-40.2 mm for females.

References

Moths described in 1879
Drepaninae